Trimming Success (Traditional Chinese: 飛短留長父子兵) is a TVB modern drama series released overseas in January 2006 and broadcast on TVB Jade Channel in May 2006.

Synopsis
The sun shines bright,
The wind blows high;
This is where he can find renewed hope in life!

Jason Fan Tin-Long (Kevin Cheng) is a successful hair-stylist and owns a trendy salon in Lan Kwai Fong. Jason has a model girlfriend Choco Ko Cheuk-Kei (Sharon Chan) who is a big money spender. Jason's family is from Stanley, Hong Kong and his father, Fan Kwong-Wing (Lau Dan) owns an old fashioned barber shop in Stanley Market. Pang Cheng (Nnadia Chan) is Jason's childhood friend who secretly admires Jason. Jason-Choco-Pang Cheng eventually becomes a love-triangle. Jason and his father also need to deal with their love-hate relationship. Jason and Pang Ching soon got married. On the finale, there were three marriages - Jason, Johnny and Jason's brother, Kenny. Choco attends the wedding, initially looking solemn as she tells Pang Cheng that it was her fault who made her lose her boyfriend. She appears to be drawing out something from her pocket to ruin the wedding (a gun, possibly) but it is revealed that she drew out a whistle. She whistles loudly to the crowd, and her friends rush over, setting free balloons. The wedding begins, and Choco tells Pang Cheng that she has got over the matter.

Cast

Viewership ratings

References

External links
TVB.com Trimming Success - Official Website 
SPCNET.tv Trimming Success - Reviews 
Butterfly's Place.net Trimming Success - Synopsis 

TVB dramas
2006 Hong Kong television series debuts
2006 Hong Kong television series endings